DSST Public Schools (DSST), formerly known as the Denver School of Science and Technology, is a public charterSTEM network comprising 16 schools on eight campuses in Denver and Aurora, Colorado, United States, in partnership with Denver Public Schools.  
DSST is ranked among the top 200 public high schools in the US.

Overview
Metropolitan area students are selected for admission entirely by a lottery. As students follow a science, mathematics, and technology focused liberal arts education, more than half of the graduates declare a STEM major in college. Students of color comprise 80 percent of the student body and 68 percent qualify for free or reduced lunch.  All DSST students follow a prospectus that includes seven years of natural sciences, seven years of mathematics, three years of Spanish, a trimester internship, and a two-trimester senior project.

History
DSST was founded in 2004 at Park Hill in northeast Denver by David Ethan Greenberg, who also served as the first board chair of its successor organization, DSST Public Schools. Bill Kurtz, a former investment banker at JP Morgan, is founding principal.

Recognition
According to the 2015 U.S. News & World Report ranking of American public high schools, the Stapleton campus was nationally ranked 192nd, 158th in STEM education, 55th among charter schools, and 5th in Colorado. In the same year, the school was ranked 5th in mathematics proficiency, tied for 15th in reading proficiency, and was ranked 5th in college readiness, in the state. In a 2014 Denver School Performance report, five of the top six schools in Denver were part of DSST.

Since graduating its first class in 2008, 100 percent of DSST: Montview and DSST: Green Valley Ranch seniors have been accepted to a four-year university.

DSST is recognized for its values-centered culture, daily emphasizing respect and responsibility,
and has been regarded as one of the top mid-size workplaces in Colorado.

Demographics

Support
Donors have played a significant role in the establishment and expansion of DSST.  Notable contributions include a $7 million gift by Liberty Media chairman John C. Malone, a $3 million grant by the Daniels Fund, $1 million gift by media mogul Oprah Winfrey, a $1 million donation by the Anna and John Sie Foundation, a $500,000 grant by the Thiry-O'Leary Foundation, and a $50,000 grant by the Bill and Melinda Gates Foundation.

References

External links
 

Charter schools in Colorado
Educational institutions established in 2004
Education in Aurora, Colorado
High schools in Denver
Schools in Denver
Public high schools in Colorado
Public middle schools in Colorado
2004 establishments in Colorado